Rhondda Cynon Taf (RCT; also spelt as Rhondda Cynon Taff) is a county borough in the south-east of Wales. It consists of five valleys: the Rhondda Fawr, Rhondda Fach, Cynon, Taff and Ely valleys, plus a number of towns and villages away from the valleys. Results from the 2011 census showed 19.1% of its 234,410 residents self-identified as having some ability in the use of the Welsh language. The county borough borders Merthyr Tydfil County Borough and Caerphilly County Borough to the east, Cardiff and the Vale of Glamorgan to the south, Bridgend County Borough and Neath Port Talbot to the west and Powys to the north.  Its principal towns are - Aberdare, Llantrisant with Talbot Green and Pontypridd, with other key settlements/towns being - Maerdy, Ferndale, Hirwaun, Llanharan, Mountain Ash, Porth, Tonypandy, Tonyrefail and Treorchy.

The most populous individual town in Rhondda Cynon Taf is Aberdare with a population of 39,550 (2011), followed by Pontypridd with 32,694 (2011). The largest built-up area as defined by the Office for National Statistics is the Tonypandy built-up area, with a population of 62,545 (2011), which covers much of the Rhondda valley. The National Eisteddfod will be held at Rhondda Cynon Taf in 2024, postponed twice from 2022.

History
The county borough was formed on 1 April 1996, by the merger of the former Mid Glamorgan districts of Rhondda, Cynon Valley and Taff-Ely (with the exceptions of Creigiau and Pentyrch, which were added to Cardiff).  Its name reflects all these, and thus also the rivers Rhondda, Cynon and Taff. Pontypridd, a University and Market Town, is the principal town of Rhondda Cynon Taf; situated 12 miles north of the capital city of Cardiff. Pontypridd is often abbreviated “Ponty” by local residents.

Some of Wales' most notorious unsolved murders occurred in Rhondda Cynon Taf in 1993, the murders of Harry and Megan Tooze in Llanharry.

Industry
The district developed from the discovery and mining, primarily for export, of high-quality Welsh coals, such as steam coal, via Cardiff and Barry docks. The landscape was dominated by coal waste heaps and deep mine pit-heads. Many of the roads are lined with  semi-ribbon development of closely packed Victorian terraces of houses which have given the Rhondda and Cynon valleys their distinctive appearance. In the nineteenth century the Rhondda had over 60 mines.

As deep mines closed, a number of very large open-cast coal mines were created and remain in operation, especially towards the north of the area.

The Welsh Development Agency, which was formed in 1976 to help reverse the economic down-turn in Wales caused by the recession in both the coal and steel industries, was very active in the Rhondda Cynon Taf area in supporting and encouraging industrial and commercial regeneration.
Recent investment in the area has included the Dragon International Film Studios, on the site of Llanilid open-cast mine. The location of the project has led it to become known locally as "Valleywood", even though the Welsh valleys are some miles away.

Environment

The coal industry has had major adverse impacts on the quality of the environment, such that most of the rivers were severely polluted to the exclusion of all fish life. Recent decades have shown great improvement with the return of salmon recorded in the River Taff and the River Rhondda but the continued presence of man-made obstacles in the rivers is inhibiting regeneration of their pre-industrial numbers and condition.

The chemical industry has also had adverse effects due to the dumping of toxic waste in the now disused Brofiscin Quarry in the village of Groes-faen. Dumping took place over a 6-year period between 1965 and 1970 by the Monsanto Company. Clean-up costs have been estimated to be over £100 million. A Dr Papageorge, formerly Monsanto's chief scientist, estimates that between 60,000 and 80,000 tonnes of polychlorinated biphenyl (PCB) contaminated wastes were dumped there.  Works costing £1.25 million to reduce health risks to local residents and members of the public using a nearby footpath were completed at the quarry in 2012. Monsanto, BP and Veolia contributed to the cost of the clean-up while continuing to deny liability.

Government
The area is governed by Rhondda Cynon Taf County Borough Council from headquarters in Clydach Vale, on the outskirts of Tonypandy, and is the host authority to the South East Wales Improvement Collaborative (SEWIC), Excellence Wales award winner 2010. The Rhondda Cynon Taf has four MPs represented in the UK Parliament. There are also four constituencies represented in the Senedd (Welsh Parliament).

Notable people

 Sir Tom Jones — Treforest, Pontypridd — Singer, know locally as Tommy Woodward
 Neil Jenkins MBE — Church Village, near Pontypridd — Wales and British & Irish Lions rugby union player
 Kelly Jones — Cwmaman — lead singer and lead guitarist of the rock band the Stereophonics
 Baron Merlyn Rees (1920-2006) — Cilfynydd, near Pontypridd — served as Secretary of State for Northern Ireland (1974–1976) and Home Secretary (1976–1979)
 Sir Geraint Evans (1922–1992) — Cilfynydd, near Pontypridd — bass-baritone opera singer

Twinning
Towns that have twinning arrangements in Rhondda Cynon Taf are:

Pontypridd -
 - Nürtingen, Baden-Württemberg (Germany)

Aberdare -
 - Ravensburg, Baden-Württemberg (Germany)

Llantrisant -
 - Crecy-en-Ponthieu, Picardy (France)

Freedom of the Borough
The following people and military units have received the Freedom of the Borough of Rhondda Cynon Taf.

Individuals
 Stuart Burrows : 31 January 2008.
 Elaine Morgan : 10 April 2013.

Military units
 The Royal Welsh: 2010.
 The Welsh Guards: 15 May 2013. 
 MOD St Athan: 2 June 2018.

See also
 List of places in Rhondda Cynon Taf

References

External links

Rhondda Cynon Taf Unitary Authority homepage 
Rhondda Cynon Taf Online news portal

 
Principal areas of Wales
Glamorgan
County boroughs of Wales
Articles containing video clips